This is a list of members elected to the Rastriya Panchayat in the 1986 Nepalese Rastriya Panchayat election and subsequent by-elections.

The list is arranged by district for elected members and zones for nominated members. Navaraj Subedi served as chairman, and Marich Man Singh Shrestha and Lokendra Bahadur Chand served as prime ministers during the term of the panchayat.

List of members elected

List of nominated members

By-election or changes

References

External links 

 नेपालको निर्वाचनको इतिहास

General election
Members of the Rastriya Panchayat
General election
Nepalese general election